Henry William Burns (c. 1904 – December 1963) was an American jazz trombonist.

Career 
Burns worked early in his career with Sam Wooding in Upstate New York and toured Europe with Wooding in 1929. He continued playing in Europe in 1930 as a member of Noble Sissle's band, and was part of recording sessions with Sissle in New York City in 1931. He also received an offer to play with Paul Whiteman. He spent most of the 1930s playing in Europe, playing principally with Willie Lewis, and also with Fud Candrix and Freddy Johnson. He also played with Bill Coleman in Egypt in 1938. In 1941, he moved back to the United States, and was less active in performance thereafter.

References

Further reading 
Albert McCarthy, Big Band Jazz, Putnam, 1974.

American jazz trombonists
Male trombonists
Musicians from Ohio
American male jazz musicians
1900s births
1963 deaths
Year of birth uncertain
20th-century American male musicians

African-American jazz musicians